Cochlicopa lubricella is a European species of small air-breathing land snail, a terrestrial pulmonate gastropod mollusk in the family Cochlicopidae. 

This species is closely related to Cochlicopa lubrica, but the shell is narrower in proportion.

Distribution
Distribution of Cochlicopa lubricella include:
 Czech Republic
 Netherlands
 Slovakia
 Ukraine
 Great Britain
 Ireland

References

 Bruggen, A.C. van. (1981). Cochlicopa lubricella and Helix aspersa as alien land snails (Gastropoda, Pulmonata) in Zimbabwe/Rhodesia. Basteria 45: 71–72
 Kerney, M.P., Cameron, R.A.D. & Jungbluth, J-H. (1983). Die Landschnecken Nord- und Mitteleuropas. Ein Bestimmungsbuch für Biologen und Naturfreunde, 384 pp., 24 plates
 Sysoev, A. V. & Schileyko, A. A. (2009). Land snails and slugs of Russia and adjacent countries. Sofia/Moskva (Pensoft). 312 pp., 142 plates
 Herbert, D.G. (2010). The introduced terrestrial Mollusca of South Africa. SANBI Biodiversity Series, 15: vi + 108 pp. Pretoria. 
 Bank, R. A.; Neubert, E. (2017). Checklist of the land and freshwater Gastropoda of Europe. Last update: July 16th, 2017.

External links
Cochlicopa lubricella at Animalbase taxonomy,short description, distribution, biology,status (threats), images
 An image of one shell of this species 
 Porro C. (1838). Malacologia terrestre e fluviale della Provincia Comasca. Milano: Guglielmini & Redaelli. 132 + [4 (= Autori ed opere citate nello species) pp., pls 1-2.]
 Schileyko, A. A. & Rymzhanov, T. S. (2013). Fauna of land mollusks (Gastropoda, Pulmonata Terrestria) of Kazakhstan and adjacent territories. Moscow-Almaty: KMK Scientific Press. 389 pp

Cochlicopidae
Gastropods described in 1835